Smaiyl Duisebay (born 28 May 1996) is a Kazakhstani taekwondo practitioner. He won the silver medal in the –87 kg event at the 2019 Summer Universiade held in Naples, Italy. In the same year, he also competed in the men's middleweight event at the 2019 World Taekwondo Championships held in Manchester, United Kingdom.

In 2015, he competed in the men's middleweight event at the World Taekwondo Championships held in Chelyabinsk, Russia. He was eliminated in his second match. Two years later, he was also eliminated in his second match in the same event at the 2017 World Taekwondo Championships held in Muju County, South Korea.

References

External links 
 

Living people
1996 births
Place of birth missing (living people)
Kazakhstani male taekwondo practitioners
Medalists at the 2017 Summer Universiade
Medalists at the 2019 Summer Universiade
Universiade medalists in taekwondo
Universiade silver medalists for Kazakhstan
Universiade bronze medalists for Kazakhstan
Asian Taekwondo Championships medalists
21st-century Kazakhstani people